Mary Lake is a lake located in Muskoka District in Ontario, Canada. The town of Port Sydney is located at its southern end. The lake was named by surveyor Alexander Murray after his daughter Mary Ellen Murray in 1853. Both ends of the lake are connected with the North Muskoka River.

Attractions
Muskoka Bible Centre is religious conference centre located on north end of the lake. Opened as a Baptist retreat in 1931 it replaced a youth camp at Fisher's Glen on Lake Erie in 1930.

Cottages along lake limit public access to a few points:

 Mary Lake Marina - a private family owned business located on the northwest side of lake. It provides paid public access to waters.

 Port Sydney Beach - a public beach managed by Town of Huntsville. The dock and waters are the responsibility of Fisheries and Oceans Canada.

Islands
The islands are believed to be former volcanic pipes from an ancient mountain.

Some of the eight islands are occupied and private:

 Bonner Island
 Crown Island - largest of the eight and referred by First Nations as Kche-negeek-chiching, or ‘Place of the Great Otter’ and later named for settler Edward Crown 
 Dead Man's Island - named for settler Captain Cock
 Gall Island - name source unknown and locally referred to as Buckhorn Island after Buckhorn Point direct across from island
 Lawrence Island - named for local settler William John Lawrence
 Rocky Island
 Forrest Island - acquired by British merchant Thomas Rumball but settled by son Charles Rumball (1825-1894) which gave the island's original name Rumball's and later as Snowshoe and lastly by heir of current family to own it William Duncan Forrest; located southwest of Dead Man's Island
 Isle of Pines - named for pines covering island

See also
List of lakes in Ontario

References

External links
 National Resources Canada

Lakes of the District Municipality of Muskoka